Tom Brown Hepburn (14 February 1872 – 13 September 1933) was a South African international rugby union player who played as a centre.

He made 1 appearance for South Africa against the British Lions in 1896 in which he kicked over a conversion.

References

South African rugby union players
South Africa international rugby union players
1872 births
1933 deaths
Rugby union centres
Western Province (rugby union) players